In science, computing, and engineering, a black box is a system which can be viewed in terms of its inputs and outputs (or transfer characteristics), without any knowledge of its internal workings. Its implementation is "opaque" (black). The term can be used to refer to many inner workings, such as those of a transistor, an engine, an algorithm, the human brain, or an institution or government.

To analyse an open system with a typical "black box approach", only the behavior of the stimulus/response will be accounted for, to infer the (unknown) box. The usual representation of this black box system  is a data flow diagram centered in the box.

The opposite of a black box is a system where the inner components or logic are available for inspection, which is most commonly referred to as a white box (sometimes also known as a "clear box" or a "glass box").

History

The modern meaning of the term "black box" seems to have entered the English language around 1945. In electronic circuit theory the process of network synthesis from transfer functions, which led to electronic circuits being regarded as "black boxes" characterized by their response to signals applied to their ports, can be traced to Wilhelm Cauer who published his ideas in their most developed form in 1941. Although Cauer did not himself use the term, others who followed him certainly did describe the method as black-box analysis. Vitold Belevitch puts the concept of black-boxes even earlier, attributing the explicit use of two-port networks as black boxes to Franz Breisig in 1921 and argues that 2-terminal components were implicitly treated as black-boxes before that.

In cybernetics, a full treatment was given by Ross Ashby in 1956. A black box was described by Norbert Wiener in 1961 as an unknown system that was to be identified using the techniques of system identification.  He saw the first step in self-organization as being to be able to copy the output behavior of a black box. Many other engineers, scientists and epistemologists, such as Mario Bunge,  used and perfected the black box theory in the 1960s.

System theory

In systems theory, the black box is an abstraction representing a class of concrete open system which can be viewed solely in terms of its stimuli inputs and output reactions:

The understanding of a black box is based on the "explanatory principle", the hypothesis of a causal relation between the input and the output. This principle states that input and output are distinct, that the system has observable (and relatable) inputs and outputs and that the system is black to the observer (non-openable).

Recording of observed states 
An observer makes observations over time. All observations of inputs and outputs of a black box can be written in a table, in which, at each of a sequence of times, the states of the box’s various parts, input and output, are recorded. Thus, using an example from Ashby, examining a box that has fallen from a flying saucer might lead to this protocol:
Thus every system, fundamentally, is investigated by the collection of a long protocol, drawn out in time, showing the sequence of input and output states. From this there follows the fundamental deduction that all knowledge obtainable from a Black Box (of given input and output) is such as can be obtained by re-coding the protocol (the observation table); all that, and nothing more.

If the observer also controls input, the investigation turns into an experiment (illustration), and hypotheses about cause and effect can be tested directly.

When the experimenter is also motivated to control the box, there is an active feedback in the box/observer relation, promoting what in control theory is called a feed forward architecture.

Modeling 

The modeling process is the construction of a predictive mathematical model, using existing historic data (observation table).

Testing the black box model

A developed black box model is a validated model when black-box testing methods ensures that it is, based solely on observable elements.

With backtesting, out of time data is always used when testing the black box model. Data has to be written down before it is pulled for black box inputs.

Other theories

Black box theories are those theories defined only in terms of their function. The term can be applied in any field where some inquiry is made into the relations between aspects of the appearance of a system (exterior of the black box), with no attempt made to explain why those relations should exist (interior of the black box). In this context, Newton's theory of gravitation can be described as a black box theory.

Specifically, the inquiry is focused upon a system that has no immediately apparent characteristics and therefore has only factors for consideration held within itself hidden from immediate observation. The observer is assumed ignorant in the first instance as the majority of available data is held in an inner situation away from facile investigations. The black box element of the definition is shown as being characterised by a system where observable elements enter a perhaps imaginary box with a set of different outputs emerging which are also observable.

Adoption in humanities 
In humanities disciplines such as philosophy of mind and behaviorism, one of the uses of black box theory is to describe and understand psychological factors in fields such as marketing when applied to an analysis of consumer behaviour.

Black box theory 

Black Box theory is even wider in application than professional studies:

Applications

Computing and mathematics 

In computer programming and software engineering, black box testing is used to check that the output of a program is as expected, given certain inputs. The term "black box" is used because the actual program being executed is not examined.
 In computing in general, a black box program is one where the user cannot see the inner workings (perhaps because it is a closed source program) or one which has no side effects and the function of which need not be examined, a routine suitable for re-use.
 Also in computing, a black box refers to a piece of equipment provided by a vendor for the purpose of using that vendor's product. It is often the case that the vendor maintains and supports this equipment, and the company receiving the black box typically is hands-off.
In mathematical modeling, a limiting case.

Science and technology 

In neural networking or heuristic algorithms (computer terms generally used to describe 'learning' computers or 'AI simulations'), a black box is used to describe the constantly changing section of the program environment which cannot easily be tested by the programmers. This is also called a white box in the context that the program code can be seen, but the code is so complex that it is functionally equivalent to a black box.
 In physics, a black box is a system whose internal structure is unknown, or need not be considered for a particular purpose.
In cryptography to capture the notion of knowledge obtained by an algorithm through the execution of a cryptographic protocol such as a zero-knowledge proof protocol. If the output of an algorithm when interacting with the protocol matches that of a simulator given some inputs, it only needs to know the inputs.

Other applications 

In philosophy and psychology, the school of behaviorism sees the human mind as a black box; see other theories.

See also 

 Black box group

 Blackboxing
 Flight recorder
 Grey box model
 Hysteresis
 Open system: 
 in (general) Systems theory
 in Thermodynamics
 in Control theory 
 Multi-agent system
 Prediction/Retrodiction
 Related theories
 Oracle machine
 Pattern recognition
 Systems theory
 Signal processing
 System identification
 Stimulus–response model

References

Cybernetics
Systems theory
Metatheory of science
Systems science
Metaphors referring to objects
Software design patterns
Programming principles